The Rhode Island Open is the Rhode Island state open golf tournament, open to both amateur and professional golfers. It is organized by the Rhode Island Golf Association. It has been played annually since 1929 at a variety of courses around the state.

Winners

2022 Ian Thimble
2021 Matt Shubley
2020 Canceled
2019 Rob Labritz
2018 John VanDerLaan
2017 Michael Carbone
2016 Jeffrey Evanier
2015 Patrick Pelletier
2014 Troy Pare
2013 Shawn Warren
2012 Jesse Larson
2011 Mark Stevens
2010 John Elliott
2009 Michael Carbone
2008 Jim Renner
2007 Brent Wanner
2006 Ron Philo
2005 Kirk Hanefeld
2004 Mike Capone
2003 Ron Philo
2002 Bryce Wallor
2001 Mike Baker
2000 Rodney Butcher
1999 John Hickson
1998 Kirk Hanefeld
1997 Scott Trethewey
1996 Dana Quigley
1995 Dana Quigley
1994 P. H. Horgan III
1993 Dana Quigley
1992 Dana Quigley
1991 Bob Menne
1990 Marc St. Martin
1989 Ed Kirby
1988 Wilhelm Winsnes 
1987 Billy Andrade
1986 Gary Marlowe
1985 Brad Faxon
1984 Jim Hallet
1983 Brian Claar
1982 Jeff Bailey
1981 Dana Quigley
1980 Peter Teravainen
1979 Joseph F. Carr
1978 Bruce Ashworth
1977 Charles Volpone
1976 Cameron P. Quinn
1975 Norm Lutz
1974 Ross Coon
1973 Dana Quigley
1972 Jay Dolan
1971 Stan Baluik
1970 Bobby Greenwood
1969 John Levinson
1968 Ross Coon
1967 Jay Dolan
1966 Joel Goldstrand
1965 Paul Bondeson
1964 Jay Dolan
1963 Cameron P. Quinn
1962 Jimmy Grant
1961 Donald Hoenig
1960 Bill Ezinicki
1959 Bill Ezinicki
1958 Bill Ezinicki
1957 John Igoe
1956 Charlie Sifford
1955 Donald Hoenig
1954 Donald Hoenig
1953 William Newman
1952 John Thoren
1951 Donald Hoenig
1950 Robert Allen
1949 Charles Sheppard
1948 Charles Sheppard
1947 Felice Torza
1946 John Kent
1943–1945 No tournament
1942 Tom Mahan
1941 Johnny Farrell
1940 Johnny Farrell
1939 John Thoren
1938 John P. Burke
1937 Jim Turnesa
1936 John P. Burke
1935 T.S. Tailor, Jr.
1934 Michael J. Bobel
1933 Michael J. Bobel
1932 T.S. Tailor, Jr.
1931 Arthur Gusa
1930 Arthur Gusa
1929 Fred Bentley

Source:

References

External links
Rhode Island Golf Association

Golf in Rhode Island
State Open golf tournaments
Recurring sporting events established in 1929